The Sant Antoni Castle (Catalan: Castell de Sant Antoni, Spanish: Castillo de San Antonio) is a fortress located in the Spanish village of Fornells, in the municipality of Es Mercadal, in Menorca. It was built in the 17th century in the local harbour and due to this building, the town was born.

Only some ruins are left from the structure, as it was dismantled by the Spanish after the British domination, just like St. Philip's Castle. Not far from there, there is the Fornells Tower, a defensive tower whose objective was protecting the castle from enemy attacks.

References 

History of Menorca
Bien de Interés Cultural landmarks in the Balearic Islands
Castles in the Balearic Islands